The 575th Air Defense Group  is a disbanded United States Air Force organization. Its last assignment was with the 4708th Air Defense Wing at Selfridge Air Force Base, Michigan, where it was inactivated in 1955.  The group was originally activated as a support unit for the 4th Fighter Group after the 4th returned to the US at the end of World War II and performed that mission until it was inactivated in 1947.

The group was activated once again in 1952 to replace the support elements of the inactivating 56th Fighter-Interceptor Wing.  A year later ADC established it as an operational headquarters for fighter-interceptor squadrons as well.  It was replaced in 1955 when ADC transferred its mission, equipment, and personnel to the 1st Fighter Group in a project that replaced air defense groups commanding fighter squadrons with fighter groups with distinguished records during World War II.

History

Strategic Air Command
The group was activated in 1946 as the 575th Air Service Group to support the 4th Fighter Group at Selfridge Field, Michigan.  Its 1044th Air Engineering Squadron provided maintenance that was beyond the capability of the fighter group, its 1054th Air Materiel Squadron handled all supply matters, and its Headquarters & Base Services Squadron provided other support. The group transferred to Andrews Field, Maryland, where it was inactivated in August 1947 and its personnel and equipment were transferred to the 4th Airdrome Group, which assumed its mission under the experimental wing base reorganization. It was disbanded in October 1948.

Air Defense Command

The group was reconstituted, redesignated as the 575th Air Base Group, and activated at Selfridge in 1952 in a major reorganization of Air Defense Command (ADC) responding to ADC's difficulty under the existing wing base organizational structure in deploying fighter squadrons to best advantage. It replaced the 56th Air Base Group as the USAF host unit for Selfridge.  The group was assigned seven squadrons to perform its support responsibilities. It also maintained aircraft stationed at Selfridge.

The group was redesignated as the 575th Air Defense Group in 1953 and assumed responsibility for air defense of the upper Great Lakes area.  It was assigned the 56th Fighter-Interceptor Squadron (FIS), flying single seat North American F-86 Sabre aircraft, the 61st FIS, flying two-seat Lockheed F-94 Starfire aircraft, armed with 20mm cannon, and the 431st FIS, flying World War II era North American F-51 Mustang aircraft from the 4708th Defense Wing as its operational elements. The three squadrons were already stationed at Selfridge. In May 1953, the 431st FIS converted to Sabres and the following month moved to Libya and was assigned away from the group. Meanwhile, in April 1953, the 13th FIS, flying a newer radar equipped and Mighty Mouse rocket armed model of the F-86 aircraft was activated as a fourth operational squadron. In July the 56th FIS upgraded to newer radar equipped "Sabres," so that when the 61st FIS moved to Newfoundland and was transferred out of the group in August, all squadrons of the 575th were flying the same aircraft, the F-86D, for the first time.  In September, the group's medical squadron responsibility expanded when the nearby Percy Jones Army Hospital closed.

The group was inactivated and replaced by 1st Fighter Group (Air Defense) in 1955 as part of Air Defense Command's Project Arrow, which was designed to bring back on the active list the fighter units which had compiled memorable records in the two world wars. It was disbanded again in 1984.

Lineage
 Constituted as the 575th Air Service Group 
 Activated c. 5 September 1946
 Inactivated on 15 August 1947
 Disbanded on 8 October 1948
 Reconstituted and redesignated 575th Air Base Group on 1 January 1952
 Activated on 1 February 1952
 Redesignated as 575th Air Defense Group on 16 February 1953
 Inactivated on 18 August 1955
 Disbanded on 27 September 1984

Assignments
 Fifteenth Air Force, ca. 5 September 1946 – 26 March 1947
 Strategic Air Command, 26 March 1947 – 15 August 1947
 4708th Defense Wing (later 4708th Air Defense Wing), 7 February 1952 – 18 August 1955

Stations
 Selfridge Field, Michigan, 5 September 1946 – 26 March 1947
 Andrews Field, Maryland, 26 March 1947 – 15 August 1947
 Selfridge AFB, Michigan, 7 February 1952 – 18 August 1955

Components

Operational Squadrons
 13th Fighter-Interceptor Squadron, 27 April 1953 – 18 August 1955
 56th Fighter-Interceptor Squadron, 16 February 1953 – 18 August 1955
 61st Fighter-Interceptor Squadron, 16 February 1953 – 6 August 1953
 431st Fighter-Interceptor Squadron, 16 February 1953 – 23 June 1953

Support Squadrons
 575th Air Police Squadron, 1 February 1952 – 18 August 1955
 575th Food Service Squadron, 1 February 1952 – 18 August 1955
 575th Field Maintenance Squadron, 1 February 1952 – 18 August 1955
 575th Installations Squadron, 1 February 1952 – 18 August 1955
 575th Medical Squadron (later 575th USAF Hospital), 1 February 1952 – 18 August 1955
 575th Motor Vehicle Squadron, 1 February 1952 – 18 August 1955
 575th Operations Squadron, 1 February 1952 – 18 August 1955
 575th Supply Squadron, 1 February 1952 – 18 August 1955
 1044th Air Engineering Squadron, ca. 5 September 1946 – 15 August 1947
 1054th Air Materiel Squadron, ca. 5 September 1946 – 15 August 1947

Aircraft

 North American F-51D Mustang, 1953
 North American F-86D Sabre, 1953–55
 North American F-86F Sabre, 1953
 Lockheed F-94B Starfighter, 1953

See also
 Aerospace Defense Command Fighter Squadrons
 List of F-86 Sabre units
 F-94 Starfire units of the United States Air Force

References

Notes
Explanatory Notes

Footnotes

Bibliography

 Buss, Lydus H.(ed), Sturm, Thomas A., Volan, Denys, and McMullen, Richard F., History of Continental Air Defense Command and Air Defense Command July to December 1955, Directorate of Historical Services, Air Defense Command, Ent AFB, CO, (1956)
 
 
  Grant, C.L., (1961)  The Development of Continental Air Defense to 1 September 1954, USAF Historical Study No. 126

Further reading
 

0575
Aerospace Defense Command units
Military units and formations established in 1952
Military units and formations disestablished in 1984